The Green Flame is a 1920 American silent crime drama film directed by Ernest C. Warde and starring J. Warren Kerrigan, Fritzi Brunette and Jay Morley.

Cast
 J. Warren Kerrigan as Frank Markham
 Fritzi Brunette as Ruth Gardner
 Jay Morley as Dan Lantry
 Claire Du Brey as Lou Tremaine
 Miles McCarthy as Truman Hardy 
 Edwin Wallock as Roger Lulay
 William F. Moran as Julius Block

References

Bibliography
 Munden, Kenneth White. The American Film Institute Catalog of Motion Pictures Produced in the United States, Part 1. University of California Press, 1997.

External links
 

1920 films
1920 drama films
1920s English-language films
American silent feature films
Silent American drama films
American black-and-white films
Films directed by Ernest C. Warde
Films distributed by W. W. Hodkinson Corporation
Pathé Exchange films
1920s American films
Silent crime drama films
American crime drama films
1920 crime drama films